Parkway Christian School is a private K-12 Christian school located in  Sterling Heights, Michigan in the Metro Detroit area.

The school formed in 2006, with the merger of Bethesda Christian School and Zoe Christian Academy.

Student demographics 
As of the 2019–2020 school year the total enrollment was 508, with 55 of those being pre-k students.

Tuition and fees 
As with most private schools, tuition at Parkway Christian varies based on the number of children a family has enrolled and their grade level, with the highest tuition for a single child during the 2022–2023 school year being $8,925 without fees, and the lowest being $3,675.

Additional fees may also be charged, including fees for: family enrollment, testing, Latchkey services, and athletic participation, among others.

Athletics 
As a member of the Michigan High School Athletic Association (MHSAA), Parkway Christian competes with both public and private schools in the Metro Detroit area. The school is also a member of the Michigan Independent Athletic Conference (MIAC), which comprises fourteen schools divided into two divisions.

A wide variety of sports are offered to students through the school year in both Middle School and Varsity teams.

The school won the Class D Baseball State Championship in 2016 after beating the St. Patrick Catholic School Shamrocks 10–3. They had faced elimination during the regional round the year prior, losing 0–1 against Novi Franklin Road Christian.

References

External links
Parkway Christian School

Christian schools in Michigan
2006 establishments in Michigan
Educational institutions established in 2006
Private high schools in Michigan
Private middle schools in Michigan
Private elementary schools in Michigan
Schools in Macomb County, Michigan
Sterling Heights, Michigan